= Additional time =

Additional time may refer to:

- Stoppage time, added match time at the end of a match in association football, called "additional time" in FIFA documents
- Overtime (sports), additional period of play in sports
